Samuel Thomas Malpass (12 September 1918 – 1983) was a professional footballer. He played as a Defender for Huddersfield Town, Fulham, Watford and Great Yarmouth, and as a wartime guest for several Football League clubs.

References

1918 births
1983 deaths
English footballers
Association football defenders
English Football League players
Fulham F.C. players
Watford F.C. players
Huddersfield Town A.F.C. players
Bradford City A.F.C. wartime guest players
Brighton & Hove Albion F.C. wartime guest players
Chelsea F.C. wartime guest players
Crystal Palace F.C. wartime guest players
Halifax Town A.F.C. wartime guest players
Millwall F.C. wartime guest players
Great Yarmouth Town F.C. players